Various people and works of art are called Jean de Paris or John of Paris:

People

 John of Paris, Jean Quidort, or Jean de Soardis, 1255-1306, French philosopher and Dominican friar
 Jean Perréal 1455-1530, French painter known as Jean de Paris
 Jean de Paris, a pseudonym of the French writer Adrien Marx 1837-1906, used for his newspaper column

Art works

 Jean de Paris (Boieldieu), an 1812 comic opera
 Gianni di Parigi, an 1839 opera buffa derived from Boieldieu's opera
 Jehan de Paris, a circa 1494 prose romance

Other

 (Saint) Jean de Paris, Forest of Fontainebleau, a hilly area popular with artists